Rob Schmidt Barracano (born September 25, 1965) is an American filmmaker. His film credits include Wrong Turn and Crime and Punishment in Suburbia. He also created a pilot called American Town for Twentieth Century Fox. He directed a Masters of Horror episode called "Right to Die". His thriller The Alphabet Killer, which reunited him with Eliza Dushku (Wrong Turn), Martin Donovan ("Right to Die"), and Michael Ironside (Crime and Punishment in Suburbia), was picked up for international distribution by New Films International.

Filmography 
 2018: Fran K
 2018: Room For Murder
 2012: Worst Thing About Coming Out
 2009: Fear Itself: The Spirit Box
 2008: The Alphabet Killer
 2007: Masters of Horror: Right To Die
 2003: Wrong Turn
 2001: An American Town (TV series)
 2000: Crime and Punishment in Suburbia

References

External links 
 

American film directors
Horror film directors
American male screenwriters
State University of New York at Purchase alumni
1965 births
Living people
Screenwriters from New York (state)